The Thailand women's national football team represents Thailand in women's association football and is run by the Football Association of Thailand. The team won the Asian Cup in 1983 and have qualified for two FIFA Women's World Cups in 2015 and 2019. Their highest ranking in the FIFA Women's World Rankings is 28th, achieved in July 2011 and June 2018.

History

2014 AFC Women's Asian Cup

Thailand qualified to the 2015 FIFA Women's World Cup by finishing the 2014 AFC Women's Asian Cup in fifth place, defeating hosts and regional rivals Vietnam.

2015 FIFA Women's World Cup

In spite of less investment than the men's team, the Thai women's team made history by becoming the country's first 11-a-side football team of either gender to qualify for a FIFA tournament without hosting one. Because of this, the Football Association of Thailand announced that they will invest more in order to improve the quality of Thai women's football. Thailand were drawn into group B together with title contenders Germany and Norway, as well as the Ivory Coast. Their only win came against the Ivory Coast by a score of 3–2, with two goals from Orathai Srimanee and one goal from Thanatta Chawong, as they finished third in the group.

2019 FIFA Women's World Cup
At the 2019 FIFA Women's World Cup, Thailand were drawn into Group F, together with the United States, Sweden and Chile. Thailand's impressive showing back in the 2018 AFC Women's Asian Cup, including holding powerhouse Australia 2–2 in the semi-finals, provided the belief that Thailand was capable to compete against stronger forces in the world. Thailand, however, began their opening game with a 13–0 thumping to the USA, which was the biggest ever defeat by a Thai team of either gender in an international tournament. The devastating defeat to the United States severely dented Thai spirits, as they also lost their later matches 5–1 to Sweden and 2–0 to Chile, exiting the tournament without scoring a point, became the worst performed team ever in FIFA Women's World Cup history.

2023 FIFA Women's World Cup Qualifications
At the 2022 AFC Women's Asian Cup, Thailand were drawn into Group B, and they lost in the quarter-finals and lost to Vietnam 0-2 and Chinese Taipei 0-3. The Thai advanced to the playoff round, and they eventually lost 0-2 to Cameroon. This defeated officially knocked Thailand out of the 2023 World Cup for the first time since the 2011 edition.

Team image

Nicknames
The Thailand women's national football team has been known or nicknamed as "ชบาแก้ว (Chaba Kaew)".

FIFA World Ranking
, after the match against .

 Best Ranking   Best Mover   Worst Ranking   Worst Mover

Results and fixtures

The following is a list of match results in the last 12 months, as well as any future matches that have been scheduled.

Legend

2022

2023

Thailand Fixtures and Results – Soccerway.com

Coaching staff

Manager history

Players

Current squad
The following 23 players are called up for the squad for the 2022 AFC Women's Asian Cup.

Competitive record
Denotes draws including knockout matches decided on penalty kicks.

 Champions   Runners-up   Third place   Fourth place

FIFA Women's World Cup

Olympic Games

AFC Women's Asian Cup

Asian Games

AFF Women's Championship

Southeast Asian Games

Cyprus Women's Cup

See also
Sport in Thailand
Football in Thailand
Women's football in Thailand

Thailand women's national under-20 football team
Thailand women's national under-17 football team
Thailand women's national futsal team

Thailand men's national football team

References

External links

Official website 
FIFA profile

 
Asian women's national association football teams